RK Mladost - Bogdanci (HC Mladost-Bogdanci) is a team handball club from Bogdanci, North Macedonia. They compete in the Macedonian First Handball League.

Accomplishments

EHF Cup Winners' Cup 1/4 Final: 1 
 1996-97
EHF Cup 1/8 Final: 1 
 1999-00
EHF Challenge Cup 1/8 Final: 1 
 2004-05

Former players
 Filip Mirkulovski

References

External links

RFM Profile
EHF Profile

Mladost
Bogdanci Municipality